Jameson Houston (born June 30, 1996) is an American football cornerback who is a free agent. He played college football at Baylor.

Professional career

Cleveland Browns
Houston was signed by the Cleveland Browns as an undrafted free agent. He was waived by the Browns on August 10, 2020.

Carolina Panthers
Houston was signed by the Carolina Panthers on August 28, 2020 after participating in a tryout, re-uniting him with his college coach Matt Rhule. He was waived on September 7, 2020, during final roster cuts.

Philadelphia Eagles
Houston was brought in for a tryout with the Philadelphia Eagles on November 20, 2020, and was signed to the team's practice squad on November 25. He was elevated to the active roster on December 12, December 19, and January 3, 2021, for the team's weeks 14, 15, and 17 games against the New Orleans Saints, Arizona Cardinals, and Washington Football Team, and reverted to the practice squad after each game. He signed a reserve/future contract with the Eagles on January 4, 2021.

Jacksonville Jaguars
On May 18, 2021, Houston was traded to the Jacksonville Jaguars along with a 2023 sixth-round pick in exchange for Josiah Scott. He was waived on August 24, 2021.

Michigan Panthers
Houston was selected with the fifth pick of the ninth round of the 2022 USFL Draft by the Michigan Panthers.

Seattle Seahawks
On August 10, 2022, Houston signed with the Seattle Seahawks. He was waived on August 28.

Vegas Vipers
Houston was one of the defensive backs selected by the Vegas Vipers in the 2023 XFL Draft.

References

External links
Baylor Bears Bio

1996 births
Living people
21st-century African-American sportspeople
African-American players of American football
American football defensive backs
Baylor Bears football players
Carolina Panthers players
Cleveland Browns players
Jacksonville Jaguars players
Michigan Panthers (2022) players
Philadelphia Eagles players
Players of American football from Austin, Texas
Seattle Seahawks players
Vegas Vipers players